This is a list of bus routes operated by the Washington Metropolitan Area Transit Authority (WMATA), branded as Metrobus in Montgomery County, Maryland or Prince George's County, Maryland. Most routes operated under Streetcars in Washington, D.C., and Maryland prior to the 1960s.

Numbering
Most Metrobus routes in MD begin with a letter followed by a number but some routes can have a double digit numbers. Prince Georges County routes would typically have a letter followed by two numbers.

Odd-numbered routes are typically part-time variants of even-numbered routes. At one time, odd numbered routes were express routes, but that distinction has been abandoned. Most odd-numbered routes operates during rush hours and or limited stops with a few of them running into the off peak hours.

History
Many current routes operate under former streetcar routes. The streetcars provided the main transportation in the Maryland area from the 1800s to the 1960s. Two separate companies, Washington, Virginia and Maryland Coach Company (WV&M), and the Washington Marlboro and Annapolis Motor Lines (WM&A) would also operate on the former streetcar routes and provide service to parts of MD when the Streetcars ended service. In 1973, WMATA acquired the two bus companies along with other bus companies to form its current Metrobus system. At one point, most MD routes would enter into Downtown before Metro was built in which all buses would terminate at stations in various locations. Today, the main MD hub is at Silver Spring station

When Ride On began service, most Metrobus routes in Montgomery County were slowly transferred into Ride On routes through the years as it would be cheaper to operate under another carrier. Same thing went with TheBus.

Due to the COVID-19 pandemic, service has been mostly reduced to Sunday service schedules during the weekdays with select routes suspended from March 18, 2020, until August 22, 2020. Routes 83, A12, C4, D12, F4, J2, K6, P12, T18, Y2, and Z8 were the only routes that ran during the weekends with the rest of the routes suspended. Beginning on August 23, 2020, more routes came back during the weekdays and weekends returning Metrobus service to 75%

Routes
Most Maryland buses would remain inside Prince Georges County and Montgomey County. However a few routes would enter into Washington DC which was a part of their former streetcar lines. Only one current route operates between Maryland and Virginia (NH2).

Routes History

Former Routes
These routes have been served by Metrobus at one point but have since been discontinued due to either low ridership, duplication of another route, simplification to other routes, combined into another route, low funding, or transferred to another bus company as it would be cheaper to maintain cost and for another carrier to operate the line. However some routes would be reincarnated into new routes for Metrobus. Examples of reincarnations were the C8, and Z6.

See Also 
 List of Metrobus routes (Washington, D.C.)
 List of Metrobus routes in Washington, D.C.
 List of Metrobus routes in Virginia

References

External Links
Maryland Timetables

Routes
Washington D.C.
Bus routes, Washington